Taperoo railway station is located on the Outer Harbor line. Situated in the north-western Adelaide suburb of Taperoo, it is 18.2 kilometres from Adelaide station.

History 

This station was built in 1920. It was originally named Silicate Siding, and was renamed Taperoo on 22 November 1920.

Originally a step down platform, it was replaced with the current island platform in 1955.

The station was upgraded in 2017 with a new shelter along with new signage and lighting.

Services by platform

References

Rails Through Swamp and Sand – A History of the Port Adelaide Railway.  M. Thompson  pub. Port Dock Station Railway Museum (1988)

External links

Railway stations in Adelaide
Railway stations in Australia opened in 1920
Lefevre Peninsula